Ydin (Finnish: nuclear, nucleus, core, crux) is a bi-monthly political magazine published in Helsinki, Finland.

History and profile
Ydin was established by Ilkka Taipale in 1966. It was started as the official media outlet of the Committee of 100. The magazine is headquartered in Helsinki and focuses on political and societal news. In the 1960s Pekka Peltola was the editor of the magazine. Another former editor is Erkki Tuomioja who served in the post in the 1970s and 1980s. As of 2012 Arja Alho, former member of the Finnish parliament, was its editor-in-chief. Asa Butcher, co-editor of Ovi Magazine, is one of the editors of Ydin.

Ydin covers both national political events and foreign policy articles. The magazine was one of the contributors to the Capitalism ’09 event, an international activity to discuss contemporary capitalism, held in Helsinki on 23 April 2009.

See also
List of magazines in Finland

References

External links
 

1966 establishments in Finland
Bi-monthly magazines published in Finland
Finnish-language magazines
Magazines established in 1966
Magazines published in Helsinki
News magazines published in Europe
Political magazines published in Finland